Piz Caschleglia is a mountain of the Swiss Lepontine Alps, located south of Curaglia in the canton of Graubünden. It lies north of Piz Medel, between the Val Medel and the Val Sumvitg.

References

External links
 Piz Caschleglia on Hikr

Mountains of the Alps
Mountains of Switzerland
Mountains of Graubünden
Lepontine Alps
Two-thousanders of Switzerland
Medel (Lucmagn)